Jean-Marie Guéhenno (born 30 October 1949 in Paris) is a former French diplomat. 

Guéhenno served as the United Nations' Under-Secretary-General for Peacekeeping Operations from 2000 to August 2008. 

He was elected Chairman of the Henri Dunant Centre for Humanitarian Dialogue (HD) board at the end of 2010. From March to July 2012, he temporarily stood down from the board to serve as Deputy Joint Special Envoy of the United Nations and the League of Arab States on Syria. He resumed his role as a Member and Chairman of the HD Centre Board in November 2012.

In 2012-13, Guéhenno headed President François Hollande's review of French defense and security policies.

He was director of the Center for International Conflict Resolution at Columbia University's School of International and Public Affairs. He also served as associate director of the Arnold A. Saltzman Institute of War and Peace Studies at SIPA and directed the School's International Conflict Resolution specialization.

He was named president and CEO of International Crisis Group in August 2014, succeeding Louise Arbour. 

In 2021, Guehenno returned to Columbia University as the inaugural Kent Visiting Professor of Conflict Resolution. He is also a non-resident senior fellow at the Brookings Institution.

Biography 

Guéhenno is the son of the French teacher, editor and writer Jean Guéhenno, author of the Occupation memoir Journal des Années Noires and a biography of Jean-Jacques Rousseau, among other works. His mother, Annie Guéhenno, was a member of the Resistance during the Second World War and a writer.

Guéhenno attended the École Normale Supérieure, before going to the École Nationale d'Administration. He was then a member of the Cour des Comptes in Paris. He has also worked in international relations and diplomacy, directing the French Policy Planning Staff from 1989 to 1993, chairing the Institut des hautes études de défense nationale from 1998 to 2000 and working with the Ministry of Foreign Affairs in France before he joined the UN.

Guéhenno served as United Nations Under-Secretary-General for Peacekeeping Operations from 2000 to 2008. He led the largest expansion of peacekeeping in the history of the UN, overseeing approximately 130,000 staff, on 18 missions.

Guéhenno is an officer of the Légion d'honneur and a commander of the Bundesverdienstkreuz. .
He is married and has one daughter.

Other activities
 Carnegie Corporation of New York, Member of the Board of Trustees (since 2020)
 Brookings Institution, Distinguished Fellow
 European Council on Foreign Relations (ECFR), Member
 World Economic Forum (WEF), Member of the Global Future Council on the Future of International Security
 World Economic Forum (WEF), Member of the Europe Policy Group (since 2017)

Publications
Guéhenno has published articles in many newspapers and magazines, including "The Impact of Globalisation on Strategy" in the International Institute for Strategic Studies' Survival, and "Globalisation and the International System" in the Journal of Democracy, as well as articles or chapters in Internationale Politik, Prospect, Paradoxes of European Foreign Policy, and Strategic Analysis. He is the author of The End of Democracy (1993, in French) and The Fog of Peace (2015).

Bibliography 
 La fin de la démocratie Paris, Flammarion, 1993 ; re-edited by Champs in 1999, ; published in English as The End of the Nation-State, Minneapolis, University of Minnesota Press, 2000, 160 pages, 
 L'avenir de la liberté - La démocratie dans la mondialisation ("The Future of Freedom - Democracy in Globalisation"), Paris, Flammarion, 1999, 222 pages, 
 Jocelyn Coulon, Jean-Marie Guéhenno, Lucien Manokou, Catherine Délice, Guide du maintien de la paix, Paris, Athéna éditions, 2006, 294 pages, 
 The Fog of Peace New York, Brookings, 2015, 331 pages,

References

External links 
 "Crisis Group Announces Next President", web site of International Crisis Group
 Jean-Marie Guéhenno: "An International Force Can Never Impose Peace", Interview by Philippe Bolopion in Le Monde, translated into English and hosted by the Global Policy Forum.

Commanders Crosses of the Order of Merit of the Federal Republic of Germany
Living people
1949 births
École nationale d'administration alumni
Chevaliers of the Légion d'honneur
French diplomats
Columbia School of International and Public Affairs faculty
Center on International Cooperation
Carnegie Council for Ethics in International Affairs